Si-o-se Pol Metro Station is a station on Isfahan Metro Line 1. The station opened on 20 July 2017. It is located on intersection in central Isfahan along Chaharbagh Avenue just south of Zayanderud. The next operational station on the north side is Enqelab Station across from the river and on the south it's followed by Shari'ati Station.

References

Isfahan Metro stations
Railway stations opened in 2017